Venera Mikhailovna Chernyshova (born 5 March 1954) is a former Soviet biathlete.

Chernyshova was a part of the Soviet biathlon team during the 1980s. In five World Championships for women from 1984 to 1988, Chernyshova won five gold medals with the Soviet relay team.

At the 1984 World Championships Chernyshova became the first female World Champion in the 10 km individual and the 5 km sprint. With the Soviet relay team she also won the first relay at the World Championships for women. Chernyshova also won individual medals at the 1985 World Championships with a bronze in the sprint, at the 1987 World Championships with a silver in the sprint and at the 1988 World Championships with a bronze in the individual.

Biathlon results
All results are sourced from the International Biathlon Union.

World Championships
10 medals (7 gold, 1 silver, 2 bronze)

*During Olympic seasons competitions are only held for those events not included in the Olympic program.

References

1954 births
Living people
Sportspeople from Perm, Russia
Soviet female biathletes
Russian female biathletes
Biathlon World Championships medalists